Aural Fixations is the fifth album from Canadian singer and guitarist Kim Mitchell. The album was released in 1992 and is certified gold in Canada. This is the first Kim Mitchell album (including the five Max Webster studio albums) that does not include songs co-written with Pye Dubois.

Track listing
All songs written by Kim Mitchell and Jim Chevalier, except where indicated
 "World's Such a Wonder" – 4:57
 "Pure as Gold" (Mitchell, Moe Berg) – 5:13
 "Big Smoke" (Mitchell, Andy Curran) – 6:08
 "America" – 4:27
 "Some Folks" – 4:40
 "Find the Will" – 4:53
 "There's a Story" – 4:37
 "Dreamer" – 4:11
 "Dog and a Bone" (Mitchell, Curran) – 4:44
 "Flames" – 5:13
 "Hullabaloo" – 4:06
 "Honey Forget Those Blues" (Mitchell) – 2:28

Personnel
Musicians
Kim Mitchell – rhythm and lead guitar, vocals, producer
Bobby Edwards, Jim Taite, Mike Francis, Rob Pilch, Bernie LaBarge – guitars (track 12)
Orest Sushco – dulcimer
John Webster – keyboards, producer
Spider Sinnaeve – bass
Greg Critchley – drums
Peter Fredette, Rob Bertola – background vocals

Production
Arrangements by Kim Mitchell, Todd Booth and John Webster, except track 12 arranged by Bobby Edwards
Recorded by Mark Wright
Recording assisted by Eric Abrahams (Cherry Beach), Bob Shindle (Cherry Beach "Big Room"), Orest Sushco and Eric Lambi (His Master's Workshop)
Mixed by Joe Hardy at Ardent Studios, Memphis, Tennessee
Mastered by Bob Ludwig at Masterdisk
W. Tom Berry – executive producer, management

References

External links
http://www.kimmitchell.ca

1992 albums
Kim Mitchell albums
Alert Records albums